Milya may refer to:
 Milyas, a mountainous country in ancient south-west Anatolia
 Milyan language, also known as Lycian B and previously Lycian 2, is an extinct ancient Anatolian language
 Milia, Famagusta, a village in the Famagusta District of Cyprus